The Jeong Nala, also called Jiwan Nala
and Nacho Chu, and called Xidagou by China, is a tributary of the Shyok River that flows from the disputed Aksai Chin region administered by China to Ladakh in India. It originates at the eastern edge of the Karakoram Range and flows west. It merges with the Murgo Nala coming from the north just before joining the Shyok River near Sultan Chushku.

Geography 

The Jeong Nala is to the south of Depsang Plains, with the Chip Chap River flowing through it, and the Depsang Bulge, which houses the valley of the Raki Nala. All the three rivers are tributaries of the Shyok River.

Just  to the south of Jeong Nala, the Karakash River flows east, while Jeong flows west. China's Heweitan military base is situated on the bank of Karakash, which is also able to strategically control the valley of the Jeong Nala. The Tiankong Highway connecting Heweitan and Tianwendian bases passes through the Jeong valley. China also has constructed a motorable road in the Jeong valley to access the Line of Actual Control with India.

References

Bibliography
 

Tributaries of the Indus River
Rivers of Ladakh
Rivers of Xinjiang
Rivers of India
Aksai Chin